Valentin Mikhailovich Falin (3 April 1926 – 22 February 2018) was a Soviet diplomat and politician.

Early life
Falin was born in Leningrad. He graduated from the Moscow State Institute of International Relations in 1950.

Career
From 1951 to 1958, he worked at the USSR Foreign Ministry. From 1971 to 1978, he was the Ambassador of the USSR to the Federal Republic of Germany. In 1978, he was appointed First Deputy Chief of the International Information Department of the Central Committee of the CPSU, a post he left in January 1983 for personal reasons. From 1982 to 1986 he was a political observer, then editor and chief editor in the newspaper Izvestia.

On 10 March 1986 Falin was elected by the Council of Sponsors of the Novosti Press Agency to the position of chairman of the APN board. In 1988–1991 he was the Chief of the International Department of the Central Committee of the Communist Party of the Soviet Union. Following the failed 1991 coup against Mikhail Gorbachev, he left government service.

From 1992 to 2000, he worked at Institut für Friedensforschung und Sicherheitspolitik an der Universität Hamburg in Germany. He returned to Russia in 2000 and lived in Moscow.

Bibliography 

 Die letzte Nuklearexplosion. Изд-во АПН, Москва, 1986. — 309 стр.
 Helden. München: Psychosozial-Verlag-Union, 1987. — 159 S.
 Ziele und Voraussetzungen eines geeinten Europas Vorstellung des Projektes Strategien und Optionen für die Zukunft Europas. Gütersloh: Verlag Bertelsmann-Stiftung, 1988. — 39 S. 
 Politische Erinnerungen. München: Verlag Droemer Knaur, 1993—518 S.
 Zweite Front. Die Interessenkonflikte in der Anti-Hitler-Koalition. München: Verlag Droemer Knaur, 1995. 
 Konflikte im Kreml. München: Blessing, 1997. — 317 S. 
 Alexander Kluge. Valentin Falin. — Rotbuch Verlag, 1995.

References

External links
 War and Peace in the Nuclear Age documentary full interviews, 7 April 1986, 9 December 1986, 30 December 1987.
 Интервью Валентина Фалина: Вторая мировая началась не в 39-м
 Hamburger Beiträge

1926 births
2018 deaths
Soviet politicians
Central Committee of the Communist Party of the Soviet Union members
Ambassadors of the Soviet Union to West Germany
20th-century Russian historians
Diplomats from Saint Petersburg
Recipients of the Order of Friendship of Peoples
Recipients of the Order of the Red Banner of Labour
Recipients of the USSR State Prize
Moscow State Institute of International Relations alumni
Honorary Members of the Russian Academy of Arts
Secretariat of the Central Committee of the Communist Party of the Soviet Union members
Academic staff of the Moscow State Institute of International Relations
Burials in Troyekurovskoye Cemetery